Arab al-Bawati, was a Palestinian Arab village in the District of Baysan. It was depopulated during the 1948 Arab-Israeli War.

It was located 4 kilometres north east of Baysan in the Baysan valley.

History
In 1882, the PEF's Survey of Western Palestine described   Kh. el Hakeimiyeh  as having  "ruined walls and a few modern deserted houses - a small deserted village."

British Mandate era
In  the 1922 census of Palestine, conducted by the Mandatory Palestine authorities,  Bawati had a population of 348 Muslims, increasing in the  1931 census   to 461, (under the name of 'Arab Hakamiya) still all  Muslims, in 86  houses.

In the 1945 statistics it had a population of 520  Muslims with a total of 10,641  dunums  of land.  That year Arabs used  2,225  dunams of village lands for plantations and irrigated land, 3,335 for cereals, while 52 dunams were classed as uncultivable.

1948 and aftermath
Many of the villagers left early in the war, apparently after a Haganah attack.    
The village was destroyed on May 16, or May 20, 1948. Following the war the area was incorporated into the State of Israel and the land was left undeveloped; the nearest village is Hamadia. 

In 1992, it was described: "All of the village houses have been demolished. The remains of basalt stone walls and the square and circular foundations of buildings can be seen among the weeds." Evidence of historic occupation includes Roman milestones and ruined buildings at the Khirbat al Bawati.

References

Bibliography

External links
 Welcome To 'Arab al-Bawati
'Arab al-Bawati,  Zochrot
Survey of Western Palestine, map 9:   IAA, Wikimedia commons
'Arab al-'Bawati, from Khalil Sakakini Cultural Center
 Interview with Nakba survivor Ibrahim Muhammad al-Bawati
 Interview with Nakba survivor Muhammad al-Bawati

Arab villages depopulated during the 1948 Arab–Israeli War